Innospec Inc., formerly known as Octel Corporation and Associated Octel Company, Ltd., is a specialty chemical company. It comprises three business units: Fuel Specialties, responsible for the development and supply of additives for fuels and which also includes the company's activities in its Oilfield Chemicals division, Performance Chemicals, which focuses on products for the Personal Care industry and also provides products for the Polymers markets, and Octane Additives, which is the last remaining non-Chinese producer of tetraethyllead (TEL) used in the manufacture of 100LL avgas throughout the world. The company has recently sparked controversy due to it being the last company to export leaded petrol from the UK to Algeria despite pledging to stop several times.

Locations
Innospec is headquartered in Englewood, Colorado, and has major regional centers in the United Kingdom and Singapore, along with international offices and processing facilities in China, UAE, Cyprus, South Korea, and India.

Production plants are located in multiple countries including UK, France, Germany, Philippines, the United States, Italy and Spain.

The company has around 2000 employees located in 20 countries.

Acquisitions and divestments
Innospec has made the following recent acquisitions and divestments:

 Strata Control was acquired in December 2013 in Oilfield Drilling Specialties.
 Chemsil Silicones and Chemtec were acquired in September 2013 in Personal Care.
 Bachman Services was acquired in November 2013 in Oilfield Production Specialties.
 Independence Oilfield Chemicals was acquired in November 2014 in Oilfield Chemicals.
 Innospec divested its Aroma Chemicals business to Emerald Kalama in July 2015.
 As of January 1, 2016; Bachman, Strata and Independence Oilfield Chemicals have been reorganized into one company, Innospec Oilfield Specialties.
 On January 3, 2017, Innospec announced it had completed the acquisition of the European Differentiated Surfactants business from Huntsman

Products
Innospec markets detergents, cold flow improvers, lubricity improvers, corrosion inhibitors, antioxidants, cetane improvers, TEL, and a range of other chemicals as fuel additives.

The Oilfield Services division provides products and services for drilling, fracturing & stimulation and production operations to customers in the oil and gas industry

In Personal Care, the company makes a range of high performance surfactants, emollients and silicone formulations.

Criminal activities
In 2007 US authorities alerted the UK SFO to Innospec's activities which had come to their attention via a UN committee and a complaint filed with SEC involving their Iraqi agents and former company executives. On March 10, 2010, Innospec pled guilty in the U.S. to a 12-count indictment for defrauding the United Nations using kickbacks under the UN Oil for Food Program (OFFP) and making bribe payments to officials in Iraqi Oil Ministry. In addition, the company further admitted to violating the U.S. embargo against Cuba, by previously selling chemicals to Cuban industrial plants. In a 2010 investigation by The Guardian and Guardian Films, published in June, Innospec, while trading as company Octel, was revealed to have been bribing officials in Iraq and Indonesia with millions of dollars in order to continue using TEL as a fuel additive. TEL causes brain damage in children through elevated lead levels. The investigations resulted in the convictions of four executives, three of whom were sentenced to prison. The company negotiated a global settlement, although this was condemned by Lord Justice Thomas of the UK during sentencing. In October 2014 the convictions of Miltiades Papachristos, a sales executive in the Pacific region, and Dennis Kerrison, a former CEO, for conspiracy to corrupt were upheld against appeals. The other two execs had pled guilty.  One of the executives, David Turner, received a suspended sentence for testifying against the other executives. The company was released from its Monitor supervision and successfully completed its parole period in early 2015.

References

External links
 

Chemical companies of the United States
Companies listed on the Nasdaq
Companies based in Englewood, Colorado